Meshir 18 - Coptic Calendar - Meshir 20 

The nineteenth day of the Coptic month of Meshir, the sixth month of the Coptic year. In common years, this day corresponds to February 13, of the Julian Calendar, and February 26, of the Gregorian Calendar. This day falls in the Coptic Season of Shemu, the season of the Harvest.

Commemorations 

 The relocation of the Relics of Saint Martianus the Monk to Antioch

References 

Days of the Coptic calendar